|}

The Prix du Cadran is a Group 1 flat horse race in France open to thoroughbreds aged four years or older. It is run at Longchamp over a distance of 4,000 metres (about 2 miles), and it is scheduled to take place each year in early October.

It is France's most prestigious race for "stayers" – horses which specialise in racing over long distances. It is the French equivalent of the Gold Cup, the leading stayers' race in Great Britain.

History

The event is named after a clock face (cadran) at the École Militaire, a building located alongside its original venue, the Champ de Mars. It was first run in 1837, and was initially contested over one and a quarter laps of the track, about 2,500 metres.

The race was extended to 4,000 metres in 1843, and increased to 4,200 metres in 1846. It was held at Versailles in 1848, due to that year's French Revolution. It was not run in 1850, and its distance changed several times in the following decade. It was restricted to four-year-olds in 1854. It was transferred to Longchamp in 1857, and reverted to 4,200 metres in 1858. It was cancelled in 1871, because of the Franco-Prussian War.

The Prix du Cadran was re-opened to horses aged five or older and cut to 4,000 metres in 1913. It was abandoned throughout World War I, with no running from 1915 to 1918. It was cancelled once during World War II, in 1940. It was staged at Le Tremblay over 4,100 metres from 1943 to 1945. It was abandoned because of student protests in 1968.

The present system of race grading was introduced in 1971, and the Prix du Cadran was classed at the highest level, Group 1. For a period it took place in late May. It was opened to geldings in 1986.

The race was moved to the Saturday of Prix de l'Arc de Triomphe weekend in 1991. It was later switched to the same day as the "Arc", usually the first Sunday in October.

Records
Most successful horse (4 wins):
 Marsyas – 1944, 1945, 1946, 1947

Leading jockey (5 wins):
 Yves Saint-Martin – Waldmeister (1965), Danseur (1967), Recupere (1974), Buckskin (1977, 1978)

Leading trainer (15 wins):
 Tom Jennings – La Cloture (1851), Hervine (1852), Papillon (1854), Monarque (1856), Compiegne (1862), Alerte (1863), Beatrix (1865), La Fortune (1866), Auguste (1867), Longchamps (1868), Le Sarrazin (1869), Boulogne (1870), Saint Christophe (1878), Rayon d'Or (1880), Milan (1881)
 (note: the trainers of some of the early winners are unknown)

Leading owner (11 wins):
 Frédéric de Lagrange – Compiegne (1862), Alerte (1863), Beatrix (1865), La Fortune (1866), Auguste (1867), Longchamps (1868), Le Sarrazin (1869), Boulogne (1870), Saint Christophe (1878), Rayon d'Or (1880), Milan (1881)

Winners since 1969

Earlier winners

 1837: Miss Annette
 1838: Franck
 1839: Nautilus
 1840: Nautilus
 1841: Deception
 1842: Nautilus
 1843: Annetta
 1844: Nativa
 1845: Edwin
 1846: Tomate
 1847: Liverpool
 1848: Morok
 1849: Nanetta
 1850: no race
 1851: La Cloture
 1852: Hervine
 1853: Trust
 1854: Papillon
 1855: Remuneration
 1856: Monarque
 1857: Nat
 1858: Potocki
 1859: Martel en Tete
 1860: Geologie
 1861: Pretendant
 1862: Compiegne
 1863: Alerte
 1864: Guillaume le Taciturne
 1865: Beatrix
 1866: La Fortune
 1867: Auguste
 1868: Longchamps
 1869: Le Sarrazin
 1870: Boulogne
 1871: no race
 1872: Veranda
 1873: Revigny
 1874: Boiard
 1875: Saltarelle
 1876: Saint Cyr
 1877: Enguerrande
 1878: Saint Christophe
 1879: Clocher
 1880: Rayon d'Or
 1881: Milan
 1882: Bariolet
 1883: Seigneur
 1884: Regain
 1885: Archiduc
 1886: Lapin
 1887: Sauterelle
 1888: Krakatoa
 1889: Siberie
 1890: Clover
 1891: Mirabeau
 1892: Berenger
 1893: Chene Royal
 1894: Fousi Yama
 1895: Excuse
 1896: Omnium II
 1897: Olmutz
 1898: Chambertin
 1899: Le Roi Soleil
 1900: Perth
 1901: Ivoire
 1902: La Camargo
 1903: Astronome
 1904: Camisole
 1905: Gouvernant
 1906: Strozzi
 1907: Ris Orangis
 1908: Kalisz
 1909: Sauge Pourpree
 1910: Aveu
 1911: La Francaise
 1912: Combourg
 1913: Predicateur
 1914: Nimbus
 1915–18: no race
 1919: Bridaine
 1920: Samourai
 1921: Odol
 1922: Ksar
 1923: Le Prodige
 1924: Filibert de Savoie
 1925: Cadum
 1926: Priori
 1927: Asteroide
 1928: Nino
 1929: Cacao
 1930: Hotweed
 1931: Chateau Bouscaut
 1932: Brulette
 1933: Gris Perle
 1934: Thor
 1935: Brantôme
 1936: Chaudiere
 1937: Fantastic
 1938: Dadji
 1939: Foxlight
 1940: no race
 1941: Maurepas
 1942: Nepenthe
 1943: Hern the Hunter
 1944: Marsyas
 1945: Marsyas
 1946: Marsyas
 1947: Marsyas
 1948: Arbar
 1949: Turmoil
 1950: Ciel Etoile
 1951: Ysard
 1952: Mat de Cocagne
 1953: Feu du Diable *
 1954: Silex
 1955: Elpenor
 1956: Bewitched
 1957: Cambremer
 1958: Scot
 1959: Tello
 1960: Le Loup Garou
 1961: Puissant Chef
 1962: Taine
 1963: Taine
 1964: Azincourt
 1965: Waldmeister
 1966: Fantomas
 1967: Danseur
 1968: no race

* Vamos finished first in 1953, but he was disqualified.

See also
 List of French flat horse races

References

 France Galop (1979–1989) / Racing Post (1990–present) :
 galop.courses-france.com:
 1837–1859, 1860–1889, 1890–1919, 1920–1949, 1950–1979, 1980–2009

 france-galop.com – A Brief History: Prix du Cadran.
 galopp-sieger.de – Prix du Cadran.
 horseracingintfed.com – International Federation of Horseracing Authorities – Prix du Cadran (2018).
 pedigreequery.com – Prix du Cadran – Longchamp.
 tbheritage.com – Prix du Cadran.

Open long distance horse races
Longchamp Racecourse
Horse races in France
Recurring sporting events established in 1837
1837 establishments in France